Tegal is a city in Central Java, Indonesia.

Tegal may also refer to:
 Tegal Regency, a regency in the northwest part of Central Java, Indonesia
 Tegal language, or Tegal dialect, a Javanese language spoken in Indonesia
 Tegal Corporation, former name of CollabRx, a medical company

See also

Tegali language, spoken in Sudan
Taqali (also spelled Tegali), a former state in modern-day central Sudan
 Tegel (disambiguation)